Stephanie Jones (born July 7, 1998) is an American basketball player who is currently a free agent. She has played for the Connecticut Sun and the Washington Mystics.

Early life 
Jones played high school basketball at Aberdeen and helped lead them to two state championships as a freshman and a junior. During her season season, she averaged 28.4 points, 12 rebounds, 6.3 assists, 3.7 steals, and 2 blocks. She suffered a torn ACL in January of her senior year. Jones was named to the Naismith Trophy Watch List and was the #51 overall player in her class.

College

Maryland
Jones played a limited role in her freshman season only averaging 9.1 minutes with 0 starts and scoring 4.1 points per game.  Her next three years saw her role and time increase. She jumped up to 24.1 minutes a game in her sophomore season and started every game.  During her senior season, she averaged 11.3 points and 6.2 rebounds on her way to being named All-Big Ten Second Team. She also received the Big Ten Sportsmanship Award and Big Ten Outstanding Sportsmanship Award – both in 2020.

Maryland statistics

Source

WNBA Career
Jones went undrafted in the 2020 WNBA Draft.

Connecticut Sun
Jones signed a training camp contract with the Sun in 2021. She made her WNBA debut on May 14, 2021 against the Atlanta Dream and scored 4 points and grabbed 2 rebounds in 13 minutes.

On May 4, 2022, Jones was waived from the Connecticut Sun and did not make their 2022 Opening Day roster.

WNBA career statistics

Regular season

|-
| align="left" | 2021
| align="left" | Connecticut
| 18 || 0 || 5.5 || .414 || .000 || .500 || 1.2 || 0.2 || 0.1 || 0.1 || 0.2 || 1.4
|-
| align="left" | 2022
| align="left" | Washington
| 3 || 0 || 6.3 || .429 || .500 || .000 || 0.7 || 0.3 || 0.3 || 0.0 || 0.0 || 2.3
|-
| align="left" | 2022
| align="left" | Connecticut
| 2 || 0 || 4.0 || .000 || .000 || 1.000 || 0.0 || 0.5 || 0.0 || 0.0 || 0.0 || 1.0
|-
| align="left" | Career
| align="left" | 2 years, 2 teams
| 23 || 0 || 5.5 || .405 || .250 || .750 || 1.0 || 0.2 || 0.1 || 0.0 || 0.1 || 1.5

Postseason

|-
| align="left" | 2021
| align="left" | Connecticut
| 1 || 0 || 1.0 || .000 || .000 || .000 || 0.0 || 0.0 || 0.0 || 0.0 || 0.0 || 0.0
|-
| align="left" | Career
| align="left" | 1 year, 1 team
| 1 || 0 || 1.0 || .000 || .000 || .000 || 0.0 || 0.0 || 0.0 || 0.0 || 0.0 || 0.0

Personal life
Jones's sister, Brionna Jones, is also a member of the Connecticut Sun.

References

1998 births
Living people
American women's basketball players
Basketball players from Maryland
Connecticut Sun players
Washington Mystics players
Maryland Terrapins women's basketball players
21st-century American women